Jorge Granier Phelps is a Venezuelan producer, director and entrepreneur who is currently known for his role as Executive Producer and Managing Director of Aquarius Pictures, including successful shows as the Netflix Original "Nicky Jam: El Ganador", "Jane the Virgin" which won a Golden Globe, an AFI TV Program of the Year award, a People’s Choice Award for Favorite New TV Comedy, a Peabody Award, and Imagen Foundation Awards for Best Primetime Television Program (Comedy), Best Actress (Television) and Best Supporting Actress (Television) and "Miss Farah".

Among other productions are titles such as the documentary "Pablo Escobar, Angel o Demonio?", the digital series "Isla Presidencial" and the telenovela "Mi Gorda Bella".

In 2009 he founded PONGALO (acquired in 2019 by VIX ), and in 2014 became CEO overseeing the diversified Latino-focused digital media company and creating a robust digital ecosystem of media properties, including the Pongalo OTT platform, Pongalo Networks’ YouTube channels, and one of the largest collections of Latino-focused digital rights in the world.

In addition, Granier serves as director of Empresas 1BC, which operates diverse media enterprises such as Radio Caracas Televisión, Etheron, Radio Caracas Radio, 92.9 tu FM, Sonográfica, FonoVideo, Recordland, and Radionet, to name a few.

Biography 
Granier belongs to the fifth generation in charge of leading Empresas 1BC, following the legacy of his maternal great grandfather, William H. Phelps, Sr., who in 1953 started the first television station in Venezuela RCTV and Radio Caracas Radio.

Affiliations 
 Academy of Television Arts & Sciences, member and juror
 International Academy of Television Arts & Sciences, member
 Producers Guild of America, member
 Motion Picture Institute, fellow
 Recurrent speaker at key industry events such as NATPE, MIPCOM, Hispanic TV Summit, LA digital, Digital Hollywood and Foro Mundial de la Telenovela.

References 

 
 
 
 
 
 

Living people
Venezuelan businesspeople
Year of birth missing (living people)